Year 287 (CCLXXXVII) was a common year starting on Saturday (link will display the full calendar) of the Julian calendar. In the Roman Empire, it was known as the Year of the Consulship of Diocletian and Maximian (or, less frequently, year 1040 Ab urbe condita). The denomination 287 for this year has been used since the early medieval period, when the Anno Domini calendar era became the prevalent method in Europe for naming years.

Events 
 By place 
 Roman Empire 
 On the same day that he is made consul, Maximian launches a campaign against an invasion of Gaul by the Alemanni. After defeating this invasion, he then invades Alemannia itself, entering across the Upper Rhine and returning to Roman territory via the Upper Danube.
 Around this time, the future emperor Constantius defeats and captures a Germanic king, the latter having prepared an ambush against the Romans.
 Diocletian signs a peace treaty with King Bahram II of Persia, and installs the pro-Roman Arsacid Tiridates III as king over the western portion of Armenia.
 Diocletian re-organizes the Mesopotamian frontier, and fortifies various locations including the city of Circesium (modern Busayrah) on the Euphrates. Around this time, he begins the construction of the Strata Diocletiana. Throughout his reign, similar fortification efforts are conducted on the other frontiers as well, with fortifications constructed or restored behind, on and beyond the borders. Conscription and the number of legions increase, although the legions themselves are reformed into smaller and more flexible units. At some point in time, Diocletian may have also established the late Roman military system of Comitatenses (field army units) and Limitanei (border units), but some scholars date this development to the reign of Constantine I (r. 306-337).
 September – The first Indiction begins.

Births

Deaths 
 Justa and Rufina, Christian martyrs
 Maurice (or Mauritius), Christian martyr 
 Quentin, Christian missionary and martyr
 Valerius and Rufinus, Christian martyrs
 Victoricus, Fuscian, and Gentian, Christian martyrs

References